Hutchinson's teeth is a sign of congenital syphilis. Affected people have teeth that are smaller and more widely spaced than normal and which have notches on their biting surfaces. It is named after Sir Jonathan Hutchinson, an English surgeon and pathologist, who first described it.

Hutchinson's teeth form part of Hutchinson's triad.

See also 
 List of cutaneous conditions

References

External links 

 

Medical signs
Cutaneous congenital anomalies
Syphilis
Teeth